The Bacolod City class is a ship class of two Logistics Support Vessels currently in service of the Philippine Navy, commissioned during the early 1990s. These ships were based  on a helicopter capable variant of the United States Army's General Frank S. Besson, Jr. class Logistics Support Vessel.

History
The two Bacolod City class ships were built by Halter/Moss Point Marine of Escatawpa, Mississippi in the United States. The first unit,  was commissioned into Philippine Navy in December 1993, while sister ship  was commissioned in April 1994. Both ships were purchased brand-new by the Philippine government through the Foreign Military Sales program of the United States. Since commissioning, both ships have been rigorously used in military and peacetime operations, and have participated in joint military exercises with foreign navies.

Presently they are assigned with the Sealift Amphibious Force (formerly Service Force) of the Philippine Fleet.

Technical details
The ships are powered by two General Motors-EMD 16-645EZ6 diesel engines with a combined power of around  driving two propellers.

As an amphibious transport, it is fairly armed for defensive purposes, and carries four 12.mm heavy machine guns at the front side decks, and two Oerlikon 20 mm cannons near its two personnel landing craft (LCVP's).

The prime mission of the ship is the direct transport and discharge of liquid and dry cargo to shallow terminal areas, remote under-developed coastlines and on inland waterways. The ship does not require external cranes or port facilities, and even in only four feet of water under full load, the ship is still able to land. This capability expands the choice of landing locations, and at the same time reduces the potential enemy impact on the logistics support operations.

The ships have a capacity to transport up to 48 TEU or 2,280 tons vehicles/general cargo, or up to 900 tons on Logistics Over The Shore (LOTS)/amphibious operations. The ramps and main deck are able to support roll-on/roll-off for vehicles up to main battle tanks.

Ships in Class

References

External links
 Philippine Navy Official website
 Philippine Fleet Official Website
 BRP Bacolod City threads @ Philippine Defense Forum
 World Navies Today: Philippines
 Opus224's Unofficial Philippine Defense Page

See also
 Philippine Navy
 Logistics Support Vessel

Ships of the Philippine Navy
Auxiliary transport ship classes